The Curtiss Eagle (retroactively designated the Model 19 by Curtiss some years later) was an airliner produced in small numbers in the United States shortly after World War I. The aircraft was a conventional biplane with three-bay, unstaggered wings of equal span. The fuselage was a very advanced design for its day, incorporating careful streamlining of its monocoque structure, and offering the crew as well as the passengers a fully enclosed cabin. The Eagle is sometimes named as the first American tri-motor aircraft; however Curtiss' own Model H flying boat flew with three engines for a time in 1914 before being converted back to twin-engine configuration.

Development
Curtiss had developed the Eagle in preparation for an anticipated post-war boom in civil aviation. In fact, this boom was far smaller than Curtiss had been hoping for, and practically all of the demand for passenger aircraft was met by the conversion of war-surplus military aircraft that could be purchased extremely cheaply. As such, only around 20 machines were built. The original trimotor Eagle design was followed by a single example of the Eagle II, with twin engines, and by three Eagle IIIs with only one engine. These latter aircraft were purchased by the United States Army Air Service, which used them as staff transports and converted one example into an air ambulance.

Operational history
On 28 May 1921, in one of the first major crashes in aviation history, Army Air Service Curtiss Eagle Serial Number 64243, the air ambulance,  of the 1st Provisional Air Brigade, crashed during a severe thunderstorm attempting to land at Morgantown, Maryland while returning to Bolling Field, District of Columbia, from Langley Field, Virginia. The pilot, 1st Lt. Stanley M. Ames, and six passengers were killed. Four of the six were Air Service officers and an enlisted man. Two United States congressmen had chosen not to make the flight because of airsickness on the flight from Washington to Langley. The Army's Inspector General conducted an investigation of the crash and theorized that the aircraft stalled when it encountered an updraft at low altitude while trying to clear trees near the unfamiliar field and fell vertically, nose first, into the ground.

Variants
Curtiss Eagle 
Three-engined passenger airliner, accommodating two pilots and eight passengers, powered by three 150-hp (112-kW) Curtiss K-6 piston engines.
Eagle II
Twin-engined version, powered by two 400-hp (298-kW) Curtiss C-12 engines; one built.
Eagle III
Single-engined version, powered by a 400-hp (298-kW) Liberty L-12 engine; three built.

Operators

United States Army

Specifications (Eagle I)

References

 
 
 

1910s United States airliners
Eagle
Trimotors
Biplanes
Aircraft first flown in 1919